The lumbosacral joint is a joint of the body, between the last lumbar vertebra and the first sacral segment of the vertebral column. In some ways, calling it a "joint" (singular) is a misnomer, since the lumbosacral junction includes a disc between the lower lumbar vertebral body and the uppermost sacral vertebral body, as well as two lumbosacral facet joints (right and left zygapophysial joints).

References

Bones of the vertebral column
Sacrum